Paete, officially the Municipality of Paete,  is a 4th class municipality in the province of Laguna, Philippines. According to the 2020 census, it has a population of 24,945 people.

The town, is located at the north-eastern part of Laguna, From Manila it can reach Municipality of Paete Passing through Rizal Province via Manila East Road or Via Slex. Along the shores of picturesque Laguna de Bay. It was founded in 1580 by Spanish friars Juan de Plasencia and Diego de Oropesa of the Franciscan Order. It is believed that the earliest inhabitants were of Malay lineage, coming all the way from Borneo in their swift and sturdy boats called "Balangay".

Etymology
The name of Paete is derived from the Tagalog word paet, which means chisel. The proper pronunciation of the town's name is Pī-té, long i, short guttural ê, sound at the end. The town was referred to as "Piety" by the American Maryknoll Missioners when they came to the town in the late 1950s.

History

Pre-Spanish Era
Before the Spaniards came, Paete was said to be a village under Gat Lakampawid, a native ruler from the ancient village of Lihan, a relative to Gatmaitim, Gat Silayan, Gat Pakil, the rulers of old town of Pakil. These native rulers from Old Lihan (now Malolos, Bulacan) was scattered along the suburbs of Kingdom of Tondo in the south and settled there. The Spanish friars had a tradition of naming towns they built in honor of saints. Paete was an exception. Legend has it that there was once a young Franciscan priest who was tasked by his superior to visit their newly founded settlements alongside Laguna de Bay. The priest knew little about the terrain so he asked a native the name of the place. The latter misinterpreted the young friar, thinking that the former wanted to know the name of the tool he was using. He answered, Paét (chisel), thus, the name Paete.

Sargento Mayor Juan de Salcedo was the first Spaniard to set foot in Paete. He was on his way to explore the gold-rich region of Paracale in Bicol. His men first encountered some resistance from the settlers of what is now Cainta in Rizal Province, but as expected, easily defeated the lightly armed natives. Then he ventured to the lakeside barangays of Laguna de Bay on his way to Bicol.

Spanish Colonial Era
Around 1580, Paete was established as a pueblo by the Friars. Juan de Plasencia and Diego Oropesa. Due to a death of the prior of Paete at that time, Paete was annexed to the Convent of Lumban. Then in 1600, Paete became a barrio of Pangil. In 1602, Paete became independent town having its own convent and was christened Pueblo de San Lorenzo in honor of the town's first patron saint. The pueblo consisted not only of Paete, but included the neighboring towns of Pakil, San Antonio, Longos and Kalayaan. In 1671, Fray Francisco Soller reenacted the Via Crucis to resuscitate the people's waning faith. He carried a cross from the town proper up to Mt. Ping-as in Pakil. In 1676, when Pakil became a separate pueblo, the townspeople of Paete wanted crosses of their own, so they built and located them in sitio Santa Ana, and named the site Tatlong Krus (Three Crosses). Paete regained its full township status only in 1850.

American Colonial Era
In 1899, American forces launched the Laguna campaign to subjugate the whole province and squelch insurrection.  On the last leg of the campaign on April 12, an American battalion of 200 men invaded Paete but met strong resistance from an inexperienced force of less than 50 men. The town was subdued but it proved to be a costly battle for the Americans.

World War II and Japanese Occupation
In 1942, Japanese troops occupied Paete, local recognized guerrillas and ongoing troops under the Philippine Commonwealth Army units were sieges and conflicts in Paete was fought against the Imperial Japanese military and local collaborators from 1942 to 1944 until retreat by local guerrillas from the Japanese hands. In 1945, combined Filipino and American soldiers, as well as recognized guerrillas liberated Paete and defeat by the Japanese and ended in World War II.

Geography

Barangays
Paete is politically subdivided into 9 barangays:
Barangay 1 - Ibaba del Sur
Barangay 2 - Maytoong
Barangay 3 - Ermita
Barangay 4 - Quinale
Barangay 5 - Ilaya del Sur
Barangay 6 - Ilaya del Norte
Barangay 7 - Bagumbayan
Barangay 8 - Bangkusay
Barangay 9 - Ibaba del Norte

Climate

Demographics

Religion

The only Catholic Church in the town is the Saint James the Apostle Parish Church which was first built in 1646.

Paete is also a pilgrimage site. One of the primary products of the town's woodcarving industry are carving of pu-on or images of saints. The town's patron saint is St. James the Apostle, also known as St. James the Great. Residents celebrate his feastday every 25 July. The 1st Patron Saint of Paete is St. Lawrence, the deacon.

St. Anthony the Abbot is a secondary patron of the town and his feast is celebrated by the townsfolk every January 17. The patron has a stone chapel locally known as Ermita as a shrine dedicated to him. There is a town legend related to the saint where a town native sneaked in the chapel during a conflagration and took a statue the St. Anthony to bathe it in the river. Following this, it began to rain and the fire was extinguished, an event considered as a miracle by the townsfolk.

Economy

The town has had a long reputation for its craftsmen highly skilled in wood carving and its embellishment. In 1887, José Rizal described Paete as a town where "carpenter shops" were issuing images "even those more rudely carved" (chapter VI, Noli Me Tangere). Even now, its inhabitants (called Paeteños or Paetenians) continue with their centuries-old tradition in carving and painting. Its statues, pulpits, murals and bas relief are found in churches, palaces and museums all over the world, including the St. Peter's Basilica in Rome, St. Patrick's Cathedral, New York, the Mission Dolorosa in San Francisco, the San Cayetano Church in Mexico, the St. Joseph's shrine in Santa Cruz, California, various churches in the Philippines and the Ayala Museum in Makati, Philippines. The official town hero is not a statesman nor a soldier but a woodcarver, the master artisan Mariano Madriñan, whose obra maestra, the lifelike Mater Dolorosa, was honored by the King of Spain with a prestigious award in Amsterdam in 1882. The town was proclaimed  "the Carving Capital of the Philippines" on March 15, 2005, by Philippine President Arroyo. It is also believed that the modern yo-yo, which originated in the Philippines, was invented in Paete.

Many descendants of these artisans have found a niche in the culinary world. Ice sculptures and fruit and vegetable carvings done by Paeteños abound on buffet tables of cruise ships and world-class hotels and restaurants. Today the town thrives mainly on the sale and export of woodcarvings and taka (papier maché), tourism, poultry industry, farming and fishing.

See also
 Battle of Paete
 Tatlong Krus (Paete, Laguna)

Footnotes

References
Madridejos, Sancho. Zonification of Paete. copyright@2003,paete.org
Madriñan, Virgil. Lanzones. copyright@2003, paete.org.
Pruden, Marie Cagahastian. Paete on My Mind. copyright@2003,paete.org
Quesada, Eugenio C. Paete. 1956. Manila, Philippines
Quesada, Frank Col. Freedom at Dawn: 7-part series. copyright@2003,paete.org
Quesada, Frank Col. World War II in Paete. copyright@2003,paete.org
Quesada, Juan, Jr. Paete: The Once And Future Village. copyright@2003,paete.org

External links

[ Philippine Standard Geographic Code]

Municipalities of Laguna (province)
Populated places on Laguna de Bay